Brooke Kennedy is an American television producer and director. Her credits include Crime Story, My So-Called Life, Numb3rs, Pushing Daisies, Fringe and Stumptown. She was also a producer and director on Third Watch and The Good Wife and currently serves as a director on The Good Fight. In addition, she was also a writer on the series Prince Street and Third Watch. In 2010 and 2011, she was nominated for two Primetime Emmy Awards for The Good Wife as a part of the producing team.

References

External links

American television directors
American television producers
American women television producers
American television writers
American women television directors
American women television writers
Living people
Place of birth missing (living people)
Year of birth missing (living people)
21st-century American women